Thimmannagudem is a village in Eluru district of the Indian state of Andhra Pradesh. It is administered under of Eluru revenue division.

Demographics 

 Census of India, Thimmannagudem has population of 779 of which 384 are males while 395 are females. Average Sex Ratio is 1029 . Population of children with age 0-6 is 47 which makes up 6.03% of total population of village, Child sex ratio is 1238. Literacy rate of the village was 55.74%.

References

Villages in Eluru district